Zavalje is a village in the municipality of Bihać, Bosnia and Herzegovina.

Before World War I, Zavalje was part of the Kingdom of Croatia-Slavonia of Austria-Hungary. It became part of the Vrbas Banovina of the Kingdom of Yugoslavia in 1931, and subsequently became part of SR Bosnia and Herzegovina in SFR Yugoslavia.

Demographics 
According to the 2013 census, its population was 72.

References

Populated places in Bihać